Athemistus assimilis is a species of beetle in the family Cerambycidae. It was described by Stephan von Breuning in 1939. It is known from Australia.

It's 11 mm long and 4 mm wide, and its type locality is Cooktown, Queensland.

References

Athemistus
Beetles described in 1939
Taxa named by Stephan von Breuning (entomologist)